The 1967 Cal Poly Pomona Broncos football team represented California State Polytechnic College, Kellogg-Voorhis—now known as California State Polytechnic University, Pomona—as an independent during the 1967 NCAA College Division football season. Led by first-year head coach Ray Daugherty, Cal Poly Pomona compiled a record of 2–8. The team was outscored by its opponents 317 to 192 for the season. The Broncos played home games at Kellogg Field in Pomona, California.

Cal Poly Pomona joined the California Collegiate Athletic Association (CCAA) in 1967, but the football team's games in 1967 and 1968 did not count as conference play since they did not play a full conference schedule.

Schedule

References

Cal Poly Pomona
Cal Poly Pomona Broncos football seasons
Cal Poly Pomona Broncos football